Sigiswald Kuijken (born 16 February 1944) is a Belgian violinist, violist, and conductor known for playing on period and original instruments.

Biography 

Kuijken was born in Dilbeek, near Brussels. He was a member of the Alarius Ensemble of Brussels between 1964 and 1972 and formed La Petite Bande in 1972. Since 1971 he has taught Baroque violin at the Royal Conservatory of The Hague and the Royal Conservatory of Brussels. He is noted for using the older technique of resting the violin on the shoulder without a shoulder rest, rather than held under the chin. He is a member of the Kuijken String Quartet, which he formed in 1986. In recent years, he has also performed as conductor of symphonies of the Romantic era.

His brothers are also known for historically informed performance: Barthold Kuijken is a flutist and recorder player and Wieland Kuijken, also a member of the Kuijken Quartet, is a cellist and gambist. They all have worked extensively with harpsichordist Gustav Leonhardt.

On 2 February 2007 he was awarded the degree of Doctor Honoris Causa by the Catholic University of Leuven (Katholieke Universiteit Leuven, Belgium).

Cantatas of J. S. Bach 
Based on the results of research by Joshua Rifkin and Andrew Parrott on the authentic performance of Bach's masses, cantatas and passions, Sigiswald Kuijken limits the vocal part to a solo vocal quartet (which Bach himself sometimes extended to eight singers) instead of a choir. He also reduced the number of instrumentalists performing each cantata. Sigiswald Kuijken adopted this approach in his recording for Accent Records of a 19-part CD series entitled Cantatas of JS Bach (being recorded over the period of 2004–2012).

External links 

 Official site of La Petite Bande
  Sigiswald Kuijken turns sixty
 Sigiswald Kuijken's Bach Project
 Sigiswald Kuijken & La Petite Bande Bach Cantatas & Other Vocal Works

1944 births
Living people
Baroque-violin players
Belgian classical violinists
Male classical violinists
Belgian classical violists
Belgian conductors (music)
Belgian male musicians
Male conductors (music)
Flemish classical musicians
People from Dilbeek
Belgian performers of early music
Academic staff of the Royal Conservatory of Brussels
Academic staff of the Royal Conservatory of The Hague
Bach conductors
Bach musicians
21st-century conductors (music)
21st-century classical violinists